Sweet potato salad is an Arab salad, made typically of sweet potato, onion, olive oil, mashed garlic, salt, ground pepper, grated ginger, black pepper, cinnamon sticks, raisins, coriander, ground sugar, and water. It is very popular in the Arab world, especially in the Maghreb as well in the Levant, specifically in Lebanon.

See also
 List of Arab salads
 List of sweet potato dishes

References

Arab cuisine
Salads
Sweet potatoes